The BLS RABe 528, also known as MIKA, is a passenger articulated trainset manufactured by Stadler Rail for BLS AG. It is a derivative of the Stadler FLIRT and began entering service in 2021.

History 
BLS planned to use the trains on Bern S-Bahn services and on longer RegioExpress services.

Design 
Each formation is composed of six cars, with a maximum seating capacity of 275. They can accommodate another 200 standees. There are different internal layouts for longer-distance trains compared to S-Bahn trains but they are mechanically identical.

Notes

References

External links 
 
 RABe 528 – «MIKA» – The future has begun
 Technical drawing

Stadler Rail multiple units
Multiple units of Switzerland
Train-related introductions in 2021
15 kV AC multiple units